The Longueuil Collège-Français were a major junior ice hockey team based in Longueuil, Quebec, Canada. They played three seasons, from 1988 to 1991, in the Quebec Major Junior Hockey League (QMJHL). The team played its home games out of the 2,400-seat Colisée Jean Béliveau.

The team was a revival of the Quebec Remparts franchise which last played in the QMJHL during the 1984–85 season. Following the 1990–91 QMJHL season, the franchise was relocated to Verdun, Quebec, becoming the Verdun Collège Français.

NHL alumni
 Joel Bouchard
 Donald Brashear
 Philippe DeRouville
 Karl Dykhuis

References

Defunct Quebec Major Junior Hockey League teams
Sport in Longueuil
Ice hockey clubs established in 1989
Sports clubs disestablished in 1991
1989 establishments in Quebec
1991 disestablishments in Quebec